Katrina Amy Alexandra Alexis Price (née Infield; born 22 May 1978) is an English media personality and model. She gained recognition in the late 1990s for her glamour modelling work, having regular appearances on Page 3 in the British tabloid The Sun, billed under the pseudonym Jordan.

In 2004, Price appeared on the third series of the television show I'm a Celebrity...Get Me Out of Here!, and the following year, she was runner-up in the search for the UK's entry for the Eurovision Song Contest. In 2006, she released her debut studio album, A Whole New World, in collaboration with her then-husband Peter Andre. Price returned to I'm a Celebrity...Get Me Out of Here! for its ninth series in 2009, and was the winner of the fifteenth series of Celebrity Big Brother in 2015. She has also starred in her own reality television series, including Jordan (2002–2005), Katie & Peter (2004–2009), What Katie Did Next (2009–2010), Signed by Katie Price (2011), Katie (2011–2012), and Katie Price: My Crazy Life (2017–2019).

Price has also released six autobiographies, eleven novels and two series of children's books. Her Angel novel series topped The Sunday Times bestseller list.

Early life
Born Katrina Amy Alexandra Alexis Infield in Brighton, East Sussex, in southeast England, Price was the only child of Ray and Amy Infield (née Charlier).  Her father left the family when she was four, and in 1988 her mother married builder Paul Price, after which she acquired his surname. She has an older half-brother named Daniel and a younger half-sister named Sophie. She is of Italian, Spanish, English and Jewish descent. Price's maternal grandmother was Jewish, but she is not religious.

Price attended Blatchington Mill School in Hove in East Sussex. She excelled at sport, swimming for Sussex in regional competitions. During her childhood, she also developed a passion for horses and horse-riding. She began modelling as a child, and at 13 she modelled for a clothing line.

At the age of 17, she changed her name, dropping the surname of her birth father Ray, who had left home when she was four, and taking the last name of her mother's second husband, Paul Price.

Career

Modelling 

At a friend's suggestion, Price had professional photographs taken and decided to pursue a modelling career. The pictures were sent to a modelling agency in London, and in 1996 she appeared, billed as "Jordan", on Page 3 in the British newspaper The Sun.

As Jordan, Price was famed for her surgically-enhanced breasts. At 20, she had the first in a succession of breast-enhancement surgeries, increasing her natural 32B to a 32FF.

Price also regularly appeared in the Daily Star, FHM, the British edition of Playboy, Nuts, Maxim, Loaded, Vogue and Esquire and also ran as a candidate in Stretford and Urmston during the 2001 UK general election, receiving 713 votes, 1.8% of the votes cast. In 2002, she appeared on the September cover of the American edition of Playboy magazine.

In January 2022, Price joined OnlyFans, but raised just £150 from one of her posts, despite pleading with followers to sign-up for the subscription service.

Television 

Price made cameo appearances as herself in the television dramas Dream Team and Footballers' Wives in 2004. She also appeared on Top Gear'''s "Star in a Reasonably Priced Car" in 2004, completing the lap in one minute and fifty-two seconds.

Early in her career, Price appeared on The Big Breakfast, and she was a guest host on the first series of The Friday Night Project. In December 2005, she released an exercise fitness DVD, The Jordan Workout, featuring "The Juice Master" Jason Vale.

Price was a contestant on the third series of I'm a Celebrity...Get Me Out of Here!, between the months of January and February in 2004. It was there that she met Peter Andre, whom she would eventually marry and later divorce. In 2007, with Andre, she hosted the short-lived late-night chat show Katie & Peter: Unleashed. In November 2009, Price made a return visit to I'm a Celebrity... Get Me Out of Here! in its ninth series. Presenters Ant & Dec insinuated during the broadcast that the surprise of her return had been ruined by the media, and she left the show voluntarily after nine days.

Price has also been the subject of many reality television series that chronicle her domestic life. This started with a trio of Channel 4 documentaries by film-maker Richard Macer: Jordan: The Truth About Me (2002), Jordan: The Model Mum and Jordan: You Don't Even Know Me (both 2004), and was followed Jordan Gets Even on Five in 2004. She later appeared in the documentary Jordan: Living With a Dream  (Channel 4) and then launched the Katie & Peter franchise on ITV2, which documented the lives of Price and Andre and included several fly-on-the-wall reality series: When Jordan Met Peter, Jordan & Peter: Laid Bare and Jordan & Peter: Marriage and Mayhem between 2004 and 2005; Katie & Peter: The Next Chapter, Katie & Peter: The Baby Diaries and Katie & Peter: Unleashed in 2007; Katie & Peter: Down Under and Katie & Peter: African Adventures in 2008; and Katie & Peter: Stateside in 2009. The pair's separation in 2009 resulted in their individual shows being recorded: What Katie Did Next continued on ITV2 until 2011.

Price was runner-up in the selection contest for a representative for the United Kingdom at the 2005 Eurovision Song Contest. In 2006 she released her debut studio album, A Whole New World, in collaboration with Peter Andre.

Between 2015 and 2018, Price was a regular panellist on the talk show Loose Women.

Price danced with her then-boyfriend Leandro Penna on the Argentine television programme Bailando por un Sueño 2012, a spin-off of Strictly Come Dancing.

In 2015, Price appeared on the fifteenth series of Celebrity Big Brother. She had been previously invited to appear on the show. On 6 February 2015, Price finished as the winner of the series.

Business ventures
Price has launched a range of nutrition supplements, including meal replacement shakes, that are promoted with unsupported claims about their wholesomeness and benefit. The British Dietetic Association named Katie Price Nutritional Supplements as constituting one of the "top 5 worst celeb diets to avoid in 2018", noting they were expensive and unnecessary for anybody wanting to lose weight.

In 2007 Price launched her first perfume, "Stunning".

In 2008 she signed a deal with Derby House to launch her equestrian range of clothing named "KP Equestrian". In 2009 Price was named as the patron of a charity polo match played near Epping, Essex.

Music
Price was runner-up in the selection contest for a representative for the United Kingdom at the 2005 Eurovision Song Contest. The selection process, named Making Your Mind Up, was broadcast live on television in March 2005. Price sang a song titled "Not Just Anybody".

In July 2010, Price released "Free to Love Again", a non-album single. About the release, she explained: "I'm not a singer, this is just something that I'm doing for fun. It's not like I'm worried about getting a chart position or number one, this is purely for fun. Whether people like it or not, I'm doing it."

Books
Price was in the top 100 best-selling authors of the decade for book sales between 2000 and 2009, with nearly three million sales. Price's books were ghostwritten by Rebecca Farnworth.

She released her first autobiography, Being Jordan, in May 2004. Price conducted a 10-day book-signing tour which helped to propel her to first position in the Nielsen BookScan hardback sales chart and to sell 97,090 copies in one year, and over 1,000,000 as of January 2007. Her second autobiography, A Whole New World, was published in January 2006. It reached number two in the hardback general category and sold 198,105 copies by 1 April 2006.

Price's second novel, Crystal, about a young woman's efforts to become a singer, sold 159,407 copies during the first three months after its release in June 2007. In July 2008, Price released her third novel, Angel Uncovered. In July 2009, Price released a novel entitled Sapphire which was number 1 on the hardback fiction chart for four consecutive weeks and sold 42,215 copies in its first two weeks in the UK alone. Price released her fifth novel, Paradise, in July 2010. In 2014, she released her tenth novel, Make My Wish Come True.

In 2006 Price signed a £300,000 advance with Random House for Katie Price's Perfect Ponies, a series of children's books, with the first six released in 2007. New books in the series have been released to a total of 12 as of 2017.

Price's daughter Princess was signed by publishers for her own book deal at the age of nine in 2017.

Price had a regular advice column in OK! magazine until 2009. In 2012, she obtained her own column in The Sun on Sunday.

Politics and campaigning
In the 2001 UK general election, Price stood as an independent candidate in the Stretford and Urmston constituency. She gained 713 votes. The seat was won by Labour's Beverley Hughes with 23,836 votes.

Following online abuse focused on her son Harvey, Price began a campaign to make online abuse a criminal offence. She took her campaign to Parliament in 2018. Helen Jones, chairman of the parliamentary Petitions Committee subsequently commented: "The law on online abuse is not fit for purpose and it is truly shameful that disabled people have been forced off social media while their abusers face no consequences. There is no excuse for the continued failure to make online platforms as safe for disabled people as non-disabled people. Self-regulation has failed disabled people and the law must change to ensure more lives are not destroyed." and went on to make recommendations for legislation. The Government was expected to respond to the recommendations by the end of March 2019.

 Personal life 
Relationships

Price gave birth to her first child, son Harvey, in May 2002. His father is since-retired footballer Dwight Yorke. Harvey was found to be blind with septo-optic dysplasia. He has additionally been diagnosed as autistic and to have Prader–Willi syndrome.

Price and Peter Andre, a British singer and television personality, began a relationship after appearing on I'm a Celebrity... Get Me Out of Here! and married in September 2005 at Highclere Castle, Hampshire. In June 2005, Price gave birth by Caesarean section to her second son, Junior Savva Andreas. In June 2007, she gave birth to her third child, daughter Princess Tiaamii Crystal Esther. In April 2009, Price suffered a miscarriage 10 weeks into pregnancy. In May 2009, Price and Andre announced that they were separating and divorced in September 2009.

In July 2009, Price began dating MMA fighter and actor Alex Reid. They married on 2 February 2010 in a private ceremony at Wynn Hotel on the Las Vegas Strip. Reid and Price separated in January 2011 and their divorce was finalised in March 2012.

On 16 January 2013 Price married her third husband Kieran Hayler at the Sandals Royal Bahamian Resort and Spa in the Bahamas, after Hayler proposed on Christmas Day 2012. In August 2013 Price gave birth to her third son. On 4 August 2014 she gave birth to a second daughter, two weeks prematurely. In May 2014 Price accused Hayler of infidelity and announced on social media that she was beginning divorce proceedings. The couple did not divorce at that time. In May 2018 Price again announced she was starting divorce proceedings, over an extramarital affair. In July 2019, Price announced she was engaged to Kris Boyson; the couple split up a month later.

 Health 
In 2002, Price was treated for a leiomyosarcoma on her finger. The cancerous tumor was removed at a Nuffield Hospital near her Brighton home.

In 2018, after being robbed and raped, Price had a mental breakdown and attempted suicide.

Criminal and civil cases
In June 2008, Price was convicted of driving while using a mobile phone in April 2008 and received three points on her driving licence. In September 2010, Price was given three points after being convicted for failing to be in proper control of a vehicle in February 2010. In December 2010 Price was banned from driving for six months for accumulating 13 points on her driving licence after being given an additional three points on her licence for speeding in December 2009. In April 2012 Price won an appeal against a conviction for two counts of failing to give information regarding a driver’s identity regarding speeding tickets issued to her relating to offences in London in 2011. Price argued she had not seen the tickets as she did not open her own post.  In July 2015 Price was convicted of failing to stop at a red light at Buck Barn, West Grinstead in West Sussex. In February 2018 Price was banned from driving for six months. In July 2018 Price reported herself to the police for driving while disqualified. In January 2019, Price faced a three-month ban on driving after breaching the conditions of a previous ban, and the following month, the ban was extended an additional three months due to drunk driving. Price had been found by police in the backseat of a vehicle in August 2018 after it had crashed, but charges of being drunk in charge of a vehicle were dropped due to a lack of evidence. In October 2019, Price was convicted of failing to provide details of the incident and was banned from driving for two years (later reduced to 18 months). In September 2021, Price pleaded guilty to driving drunk without insurance and while disqualified. In December, she was given a 16-week suspended sentence, with a condition of unpaid work, and a two-year driving ban. This was for a crash which resulted in the car overturning near Partridge Green, near Horsham.

In August 2003 Price was arrested following an incident in July 2003 for an alleged assault at a nightclub in Birmingham. No further action was taken by the police into the incident.

In 2006, Joanne Hillman, a nanny employed by Price, was charged with benefit fraud. Hillman was initially tried in 2007 and Price was subsequently summoned to give evidence. As a result of media reporting, the trial collapsed. Hillman was retried in 2008 but no evidence was offered and Hillman was acquitted.

In September 2009 Price claimed that she had previously been raped by a "famous celebrity", although she had not reported the incident. Price said that she would "absolutely never" reveal who the attacker was. Surrey Police stated that they had not contacted Price: "No allegation of rape has been made and Miss Price will not be making a statement to police".

In March 2018 Price was carjacked and robbed while filming in South Africa. In September 2022, she further reported that she had been raped during the incident.

In November 2019, Price declared bankruptcy. Her debts were listed as totalling more than £3.5 million. In August 2018, Price had a bankruptcy hearing at the High Court hearing which was adjourned to give her three months to pay off her debts through an individual voluntary arrangement. 

In June 2019, Price was fined after shouting abuse at a woman in a school playground, in Shipley, West Sussex. Price was issued a five-year restraining order against her banning her from making any contact with the woman. Price was additionally ordered to pay £606 in fines and court costs. In May 2022, Price pleaded guilty at Lewes Crown Court to breaching a restraining order. 

In June 2019 Horsham District council began enforcement action against Price for demolition and construction works undertaken at her property. The enforcement action concluded in October 2019 when Price was given 30 days to remove the new construction and restore the demolished structures.

 Filmography 
 Television 

 As herself 

 Film 

 DVDs 

 Discography 

 Albums 

Singles

 Awards and nominations 

 Bibliography 
The first 14 of Price's books were ghostwritten by Rebecca Farnworth.

 Autobiographies 

 Being Jordan (2004)
 A Whole New World (2006)
 Pushed to the Limit (2008)
 You Only Live Once (2010)
 Love, Lipstick and Lies (2013)
 Reborn (2016)

 Novels 

 Angel (2006)
 Crystal (2007)
 Angel Uncovered (2008)
 Sapphire (2009)
 Paradise (2010)
 The Comeback Girl (2011)
 Santa Baby (2011)
 In the Name of Love (2012)
 Hes the One (2013)
 Make my wish come true (2014)
 Playing with fire (2018)

 Children series 

 Perfect Ponies (2007–present)
 Here Comes the Bride, Little Treasures, Fancy Dress Ponies, Pony Club Weekend, The New Best Friend, Ponies to the Rescue, My Pony Care Book, Star Ponies, Pony 'n' Pooch, Pony in Disguise, Stage Fright!, Secrets and Surprises, Wild West Weekend (in order of publication date)
 Mermaids & Pirates (2008–present)
 Follow the Fish, I Spy, Let's Build a Sandcastle, A Sunny Day, Telescope Overboard, Time for a Picnic, All Around, Hide and Seek, Katie the Mermaid, Katie's Day, Peter's Friends, Pirate Olympics (in order of publication date)

 Fashion book 

 Standing Out'' (2009)

See also 
 List of glamour models

References

External links 

 – official site

 
1978 births
Living people
English autobiographers
English female models
Price, Katie
English people of Jewish descent
English people of Spanish descent
English people of Italian descent
English socialites
English television personalities
English victims of crime
English women in business
English women novelists
Association footballers' wives and girlfriends
Independent British political candidates
Musicians from Sussex
Page 3 girls
People from Brighton
Peter Andre
Rape in South Africa
Reality show winners
I'm a Celebrity...Get Me Out of Here! (British TV series) participants
21st-century English novelists
English children's writers
Women autobiographers